Zou Xuexiao (born 24 July 1963) is a Chinese botanist and an academician of the Chinese Academy of Engineering, currently serving as president of Hunan Agricultural University.

Biography 
Zou was born in Tongzi Township, Hengyang County, Hunan, on 24 July 1963. He has four siblings. He secondary studied at Hengyang County No. 6 High School. In 1979, he enrolled at Hunan Agricultural University where he received his bachelor's degree in vegetables in 1983 and his master's degree in genetic breeding in 1986. He received his doctor's degree in agronomy from Nanjing Agricultural University in 2005.

In July 1986, he worked as an official at the Hunan Academy of Agricultural Sciences, becoming director of Vegetable Research Institute in 1996, vice president in 2000, and president in 2005. He joined the Chinese Communist Party in September 1994. In December 2018, he was appointed president of Hunan Agricultural University, replacing Fu Shaohui.

Personal life 
Zou is married and has a daughter.

Honours and awards 
 1995 State Science and Technology Progress Award (Second Class)
 1999 National Labor Medal
 2000 State Science and Technology Progress Award (Second Class)
 2003 State Science and Technology Progress Award (Second Class)
 2016 State Science and Technology Progress Award (Second Class)
 2017 Science and Technology Progress Award of the Ho Leung Ho Lee Foundation
 27 November 2017 Member of the Chinese Academy of Engineering (CAE)

References 

1963 births
Living people
People from Hengyang
Engineers from Hunan
Hunan Agricultural University alumni
Nanjing Agricultural University alumni
20th-century Chinese botanists
Members of the Chinese Academy of Engineering
21st-century Chinese botanists